Pedro Guerrero (died 1613) was a Roman Catholic prelate who served as Bishop of Ugento (1599–1613).

Biography
On 15 December 1599, he was appointed by Pope Paul V as Bishop of Ugento.
He served as Bishop of Ugento until his death in 1613.

References

External links and additional sources
 (for Chronology of Bishops) 
 (for Chronology of Bishops) 

1613 deaths
17th-century Italian Roman Catholic bishops
Bishops appointed by Pope Paul V